Spindalis is a genus consisting of four non-migratory species of bird. It is the only genus in the family Spindalidae.  The species are mostly endemic to the West Indies; exceptions include populations of western spindalises on Cozumel Island, off the Yucatán Peninsula's east coast, and in extreme southeastern Florida. The species were traditionally considered aberrant members of the tanager family Thraupidae. Taxonomic studies recover them as a sister group to the Puerto Rican tanager (family Nesospingidae), and some group Spindalidae and Nesospingidae within the Phaenicophilidae.

Males are characterized by bright plumage while females are duller and have a different coloration. The nests are cup-shaped.

Species
The genus contains four species:

Taxonomy
Historically, the genus consisted of a single polytypic species, Spindalis zena (with the common name of stripe-headed tanager), with eight recognized subspecies—S. z. townsendi and S. z. zena from the Bahamas, S. z. pretrei from Cuba, S. z. salvini from Grand Cayman, S. z. dominicensis from Hispaniola and Gonâve Island, S. z. portoricensis from Puerto Rico, S. z. nigreciphala from Jamaica, and S. z. benedicti from Cozumel Island. In 1997, based primarily on morphological and vocalization differences, three of the subspecies (portoricensis, dominicensis and nigricephala) were elevated to species status. S. zena remained a polytypic species with five recognized subspecies—S. z. pretrei, S. z. salvini, S. z. benedicti, S. z. townsendi, and S. z. zena.

References

Sources

 
Bird genera
Passeroidea
Taxa named by Sir William Jardine
Taxa named by Prideaux John Selby